French football club Lille OSC played its first game in European competitions in the 1951 Latin Cup. Their first game was against Portuguese club Sporting Clube de Portugal.

Overall record
Page is a work in progress.

Latin Cup and 1967 Intertoto Cup excluded because they weren’t organised by UEFA.

Legend: GF = Goals For. GA = Goals Against. GD = Goal Difference.

Results 

*= Rematch instead of Home and Away tie

References

Lille OSC
French football clubs in international competitions